The 2014 Bexley Council election took place on 22 May 2014 to elect members of Bexley Council in England. This was on the same day as other local elections.

Overall results
The Conservatives retained control of the council, winning 45 seats (-7). However, both Labour (+4) and UKIP (+3) gained seats from the Conservatives.

|}

Ward results

Barnehurst

Belvedere

Blackfen & Lamorbey

References

Bexley
2014